Söz Vermiş Şarkılar is a tribute album to Murathan Mungan. All of the lyrics are written by Murathan Mungan. Every song in the album is performed by different popular Turkish musicians.

Track listing

all lyrics by: Murathan Mungan

External links
ideefixe album page 
michaelshow.net album review 

2004 compilation albums
Pop albums by Turkish artists
Compilation albums by Turkish artists
Pop compilation albums
Tribute albums